The Champion Beer of Wales is a beer award presented annually by the Campaign for Real Ale at the Great Welsh Beer & Cider Festival in Cardiff, Wales.

The award is selected by a multi-tier system. First, individual branches of CAMRA nominate beers that have been in regular, non-seasonal production for at least one year from Welsh breweries in a series of CAMRA-defined categories. The most commonly nominated beers in each category are then presented to tasting panels, with one panel consisting of four to six people tasting each beer in a particular style in a blind tasting. These tasting panels are selected from CAMRA members and other individuals, including members of the brewing industry (although representatives of nominated beers' breweries are excluded). The winners in each of these categories are then presented to a new panel consisting of local celebrities, politicians, and brewers, who, again blind tasting, selects an overall champion, silver medalist, and bronze medalist. Awards are given for the top beer in each category and the three overall top places.

Winners

Current & previous winners are summarized:

See also

 Beer in Wales

References

External links
 Great Welsh Beer and Cider Festival
 CAMRA

Beer awards
Beer in Wales